Rag-e Halil (also Romanized as Rag-e Halīl; also known as Kūh-e Halīl) is a village in Dasht-e Lali Rural District, in the Central District of Lali County, Khuzestan Province, Iran. At the 2006 census, its population was 49, in 5 families.

References 

Populated places in Lali County